Putten is a railway station located in Putten, Netherlands. The station was opened on 20 August 1863 and is located on the Amersfoort–Zwolle section of the Utrecht–Kampen railway (Centraalspoorweg). The station is operated by Nederlandse Spoorwegen.

Train services
The following services call at Putten:

Bus services

External links
NS website 
Dutch Public Transport journey planner 

Railway stations in Gelderland
Railway stations opened in 1863
Railway stations on the Centraalspoorweg
Putten